Sound of Lies is the fifth studio album by American rock band The Jayhawks. It peaked at number 112 on the Billboard 200.

With the departure of Mark Olson, Gary Louris became the principal songwriter for Sound of Lies, with an occasional co-write with bassist Marc Perlman. New drummer Tim O'Reagan also contributed "Bottomless Cup".

Reception

Sara Scribner of the Los Angeles Times felt that Sound of Lies was the work of the band "still reaching to discover what it is" in the wake of Mark Olson's departure, though noting that "despite battling emotions, muddled messages and elusive experimentation, this is still a brave album." David Browne of Entertainment Weekly wrote that while "the music can still have a breathtaking, across-the-great-divide sweep", the album as a whole "is caught between two worlds — it's a little bit wimpy country, a little bit wimpy rock & roll — and ends up lacking the power of either." Robert Christgau of The Village Voice assigned it a "dud" rating, indicating "a bad record whose details rarely merit further thought."

In a retrospective review for AllMusic, critic Thom Owen called Sound of Lies "the band's most ambitious album to date" and felt that Louris' lyrics "have a naked, emotional honesty which would have been more affecting if the music echoed its sentiment, yet the record still has a subtle grace and power, proving that the Jayhawks remain a distinctive band without Olson."

Track listing
All songs written by Gary Louris, unless otherwise noted.
 "The Man Who Loved Life" – 5:00
 "Think About It" (Louris, Marc Perlman) – 5:37
 "Trouble" (Perlman, Louris) – 4:50
 "It's Up to You" – 3:38
 "Stick in the Mud" – 3:34
 "Big Star" – 4:25
 "Poor Little Fish" – 3:56
 "Sixteen Down" – 5:23
 "Haywire" – 5:21
 "Dying on the Vine" (Louris, Perlman) – 5:52
 "Bottomless Cup" (Tim O'Reagan) – 4:14
 "Sound of Lies" – 3:56

European CD bonus track
 "I Hear You Cry" – 3:48 (Perlman)

2014 expanded reissue bonus tracks
 "I Hear You Cry" – 3:48 (Perlman)
 "Sleepyhead" – 3:29 (B-side of "Big Star" single)
 "Kirby's Tune" – 5:34 (Kraig Johnson, Louris, Perlman, Karen Grotberg, O'Reagan) (studio outtake – previously unreleased)
 "It's Up to You" – 3:37 (alternate version – previously unreleased)
 "Sound of Lies" – 4:24 (rough mix – previously unreleased)

Personnel
The Jayhawks
Gary Louris – guitar, vocals
Marc Perlman – bass, guitar, vocals
Karen Grotberg – organ, piano, keyboards, Wurlitzer, vocals
Tim O'Reagan – drums, vocals
Kraig Johnson – guitar, E-Bow
Jessy Greene – violin, viola, cello

Additional musicians
Matthew Sweet – vocals
Pauli Ryan – percussion

Production notes
Brian Paulson – producer, mixing
George Drakoulias – mixing
Mark Haines – engineer
Victor Janacua – engineer
Brian Jenkins – engineer
Jim Scott – mixing
Stephen Marcussen – mastering
Allen Sanderson – assistant engineer, mixing assistant
Mike Scotella – assistant engineer, mixing assistant
Joe Zook – assistant engineer
Dan Corrigan – photography

References

External links
Jayhawks fan site discography.

The Jayhawks albums
1997 albums
Albums produced by Brian Paulson